José Luis Ebatela Nvo (born 29 October 1972) is an Equatoguinean middle-distance runner. He competed in the men's 1500 metres at the 2000 Summer Olympics.

References

1972 births
Living people
Athletes (track and field) at the 2000 Summer Olympics
Equatoguinean male middle-distance runners
Olympic athletes of Equatorial Guinea
Place of birth missing (living people)